Operative may refer to:

 Operative Media, an advertising company, founded 2000
 The Operative (film), a 2019 thriller film
 The Operative (Firefly), a character from the Firefly media franchise
 The Operative: No One Lives Forever, a 2000 video game

See also

 
 Agent (disambiguation)
 Cooperative (disambiguation)
 Operation (disambiguation)
 Operator (disambiguation)
 OP (disambiguation)